Phyllonorycter pseudoplataniella is a moth of the family Gracillariidae. It is known from France and Germany.

The larvae feed on Acer pseudoplatanus. They mine the leaves of their host plant.

References

pseudoplataniella
Moths of Europe
Moths described in 1874